Ohatchecama (Yavapai: "Striking Enemy"; also known as Ocho-cama and Ah-oochy Kah-mah, among other variations) was a Tolkepaya Yavapai leader who was arrested for taking part in the Wickenburg Massacre. Fighting broke out between soldiers as they attempted to arrest the Yavapai leader, and Ohatchecama's brother was killed. The next day, Ohatchecama was seriously wounded while trying to escape and was reported dead, but survived his injuries and later turned up at Fort Date Creek.

N0tes

References

Books of the Southwest: The Wickenburg Massacre

Native American leaders
Yavapai
19th-century American people